Edmundo Rey Kelly (known as Raimundo Soto; 1914 in Montevideo, Uruguay – July 7, 1983 in Montevideo, Uruguay) was an Uruguayan film, stage and television actor during the country's Golden Age of film.

He also starred several television comedy shows in Uruguay, Argentina, Chile and other Latin American countries, together with a famous group of Uruguayans: Ricardo Espalter, Enrique Almada, Eduardo D'Angelo, Andrés Redondo, Berugo Carámbula, Henny Trayles, Julio Frade.

Soto worked as an announcer created a disc jockey and entertainment program on Uruguayan Radio, Centenario. also in previews year was co-owner with his Brother Mario Reykelly of Advertising Company call Reykelly & Berens Advertise.  Family Live: He married and Italian born & Raise in Milano, Maria Legnani, On Montevideo on Sep, 3, 1951 and have 6 children's, all born in Uruguay. 1)Edmundo Charles,DOB 1952. Maria Teresa, DOB 1953, Ana Ines DOB 1954, Patricia Maria, 1955, Maria luisa Dob Sep/1960 and Andres Martin DOB 1967.

Filmography 

 1965: La Industria del matrimonio 
 1966: El horno no está para bollos
 1967: Cómo seducir a una mujer
 1971: Paula contra la Mitad Más Uno 
 1971: La Gran Ruta 
 1973: Yo gané el Prode, ¿y Usted?
 1974: Clínica con Música 
 1976: El Gordo de América
 1976: La Noche del Hurto 
 1976: Tú me enloqueces
 1977: El Soltero
 1977: Brigada en Acción
 1977: La Obertura

Television
 1963: Telecataplúm
 1963/1968: Operación Ja-Já
 1970/1971: Jaujarana Punch 
 1974: Hupumorpo
 1975: Siesta
 1977: Decalegrón

External links

Raimundo Soto at Cine Nacional

1914 births
1983 deaths
Uruguayan people of Spanish descent
Uruguayan people of Irish descent
People from Montevideo
Uruguayan male film actors
Uruguayan male stage actors
Uruguayan male television actors
20th-century Uruguayan male actors